Östermalms IP is a sports ground located in the Östermalm district of Stockholm, Sweden. Completed in 1906, the facility played host to several sports during the 1912 Summer Olympics. These sports included equestrian, fencing (including the part for the modern pentathlon), and tennis. It also hosted the exhibition for baseball at those same games. Current tenants are the bandy department of Djurgårdens IF, the youth program of the said club's football department and several lower league teams. The athletic grounds also hosts a speed skating rink during winter.

The ice hockey rink was completed for the 1926–1927 season.

References
1912 Summer Olympics official report. pp. 218–20. - accessed 8 July 2010.

Venues of the 1912 Summer Olympics
Olympic equestrian venues
Olympic fencing venues
Olympic modern pentathlon venues
Olympic tennis venues
Sports venues in Stockholm
Sport in Stockholm
Speed skating venues in Sweden
Football venues in Stockholm
1906 establishments in Sweden
Sports venues completed in 1906